The 2022 Georgia State Panthers baseball team represented Georgia State University during the 2022 NCAA Division I baseball season. The Panthers played their home games at Georgia State Baseball Complex and were led by third-year head coach Brad Stromdahl. They were members of the Sun Belt Conference.

Preseason

Sun Belt Conference Coaches Poll
The Sun Belt Conference Coaches Poll was released on February 9, 2022.  Georgia State was picked to finish eleventh with 34 votes.

Preseason All-Sun Belt Team & Honors

Miles Smith (USA, Sr, Pitcher)
Hayden Arnold (LR, Sr, Pitcher)
Tyler Tuthill (APP, Jr, Pitcher)
Brandon Talley (LA, Sr, Pitcher)
Caleb Bartolero (TROY, Jr, Catcher)
Jason Swan (GASO, Sr, 1st Base)
Luke Drumheller (APP, Jr, 2nd Base)
Eric Brown (CCU, Jr, Shortstop)
Ben Klutts (ARST, Sr, 3rd Base)
Christian Avant (GASO, Sr, Outfielder)
Josh Smith (GSU, Jr, Outfielder)
Rigsby Mosley (TROY, Sr, Outfielder)
Cameron Jones (GSU, So, Utility)
Noah Ledford (GASO, Jr, Designated Hitter)

Personnel

Schedule and results

Schedule Source:
*Rankings are based on the team's current ranking in the D1Baseball poll.

References

Georgia State
 Georgia State Panthers baseball seasons
Georgia State Panthers baseball